Nick Wright (born October 3, 1984) is an American sports television personality and sports radio talk show host. Wright currently serves as a co-host on Fox Sports 1's First Things First (FTF) alongside Kevin Wildes and Chris Broussard.

Early years
Nick Wright was born and raised in Kansas City, Missouri. He attended Syracuse University's S. I. Newhouse School of Public Communications, graduating with a degree in broadcast journalism in 2007. While at Syracuse, he worked at WAER-FM as Sports Director. Shortly after graduating, he was a contestant on Who Wants to Be a Millionaire.

Sports broadcasting career
After graduating from Syracuse, Wright began his sports broadcasting career as production assistant and weekend host for the KCSP 610 AM radio station, based in his hometown of Kansas City, Missouri. He then began hosting What's Wright with Nick Wright?,  his own weekly program on the station. The Pitch, a local Kansas City newspaper, called Wright "610 Sports' most polarizing and likely most popular host," and also named him the best sports personality in 2010. Following his time in Kansas City, Wright co-hosted In the Loop with Nick and Lopez on KILT 610 AM, a Houston-based radio station.

Wright parlayed his experience in sports radio into a broadcast television career as he began working with Fox Sports in 2016. His early work at Fox involved regularly contributing to FS1's daily studio shows. He often appeared as a guest host of The Herd. In late December 2016, Wright and former wide receiver Cris Carter co-hosted an episode of The Herd, while its regular host Colin Cowherd was out for vacation. Then-Fox Sports executive Jamie Horowitz used Carter and Wright's co-hosting venture to test their chemistry together, in order to assess the potential of them co-hosting a daily morning sports talk show on FS1. At the time, the early morning block (6:00–9:30 AM EST) was "a black hole for FS1", according to Sporting News, as the network used that slot for game replays and reruns of other shows.

Carter and Wright proved to be a successful pairing, as they were then paired up to host FS1's morning talk show First Things First, which premiered on September 5, 2017. Carter and Wright were joined by reporter Jenna Wolfe, who fills the show's moderator and anchor role. First Things First also functioned as a lead-in program for Skip and Shannon: Undisputed. In 2018, it was announced Wright would begin hosting What's Wright, a weekday radio show on Sirius XM's Mad Dog Radio. 

In 2022, Wright began co-hosting his What's Wright? podcast with his son, Damonza Byrd.

Reception
Wright's sports commentary has received both praise and criticism from media outlets. Complexs Aaron Mansfield wrote, "First Things First is actually [an] enjoyable, reasonable sports talk, and Wright is a big reason for that," and opined that "[Wright] knows how to build a convincing argument behind statistics." Mansfield added: "The Syracuse grad has differentiated himself in sports media because of his persuasive nature, his defend-LeBron-to-the-death mentality, and his willingness to confront prevalent social issues such as race in America."

Wright's willingness to discuss social and political issues within a broader sports-related context has also been noted and praised by media outlets.  Wright's opinions on the U.S. national anthem protests sparked by Colin Kaepernick's activism was positively received by German Lopez of Vox, which wrote "Nick Wright has given what is perhaps the best distillation of the topic I have seen on television."

Wright's positive analysis of LeBron James' basketball play has also been noted by media outlets. Mansfield commented, "Granted, yes, sometimes [Wright's] LeBron takes are a stretch." Kyle Koster of The Big Lead wrote, "Part of [Wright's] shtick is not pretending he checks fandom at the door (see: his LeBron James love affair). That's what helps him connect with viewers who, by and large, are sports fans themselves, grappling with the same biases."

In June 2019, Wright received media attention for making an inaccurate claim during an episode of First Things First about the awarding of the 2015 NBA Finals MVP Award to Andre Iguodala. After multiple Finals MVP voters and an NBA representative debunked Wright's version of events, Wright apologized.

In February 2020, Wright said about the Golden State Warriors trade for Andrew Wiggins, "Wiggins is a bad basketball player", and that the trade jeopardized any future success: "We will never see Steph [Curry] in another NBA Finals. Ever. They have no path forward."  However, the Warriors won the 2022 NBA Championship with Curry as the Finals MVP and Wiggins as the Warriors' 2nd leading scorer.

Poker career 
Wright made his first poker-related appearance on PokerGO's video podcast No Gamble, No Future, in March 2021. Wright would make his second appearance in June 2021 where it was announced that he would be playing in PokerGO's High Stakes Duel III against Phil Hellmuth on July 28, 2021. It was also revealed that Wright would appear in the upcoming Season 13 of PokerGO's Poker After Dark, alongside poker professionals Hellmuth, Maria Ho, and Daniel Negreanu, as well as mixed martial arts announcer Bruce Buffer.

Personal life 
Wright is of partial Polish-Jewish descent through one of his grandfathers. He also has Irish and Italian ancestry and was raised Roman Catholic. He and his wife have one child and his wife has two other children from other relationships. He has a sister named Joanna.

References 

1984 births
American podcasters
American poker players
American sports radio personalities
American television talk show hosts
Fox Sports 1 people
Living people
Radio personalities from Kansas City, Missouri
S.I. Newhouse School of Public Communications alumni
Sports commentators
Sports YouTubers